Association Sportive Saint-Amandoise is a French association football club founded in 1989. They are based in the town of Saint-Amand-Montrond and their home stadium is the Stade Municipal Alphonse Gesset. As of the 2013–14 season, the club plays in the Division d'Honneur de Centre, the sixth tier of French football.

External links
AS Saint-Amandoise official website 

Saint Amand
Saint Amand
1989 establishments in France
Sport in Cher (department)
Football clubs in Centre-Val de Loire